HTV-2 may refer to:
 Kounotori 2, the second H-II Transfer Vehicle
 Hypersonic Technology Vehicle 2, part of the DARPA Falcon Project
 HTV2, entertainment private channels in Ho Chi Minh City Television